Señora Acero (English title: Woman of Steel), is an American telenovela produced by Telemundo and distributed by Telemundo Television Studios and Argos Comunicación.

Series overview

Episodes

Season 1 (2014-15)

Season 2 (2015-16)

Season 3: La Coyote (2016)

Season 4: La Coyote (2017-2018)

Season 5: La Coyote (2018-2019)

Special

References 

Lists of American drama television series episodes
Lists of Mexican drama television series episodes
Señora Acero